Changes One is an album by the jazz composer and bassist Charles Mingus, released in 1975.

Song notes

"Remember Rockefeller at Attica" 

This track is dedicated to the Attica Prison Riots of 1971 and the Governor of New York State at that time, Nelson Rockefeller.

"Devil Blues" 

The lyrics are by Clarence “Gatemouth” Brown, but the melody is newly composed by vocalist and saxophonist George Adams.  Mingus also has composing credits, possibly for the horn lines which follow the singing.

Track listing
All compositions by Charles Mingus except where noted.

"Remember Rockefeller at Attica" – 5:56
"Sue's Changes" – 17:04
"Devil Blues" (George Adams, Clarence "Gatemouth" Brown, Mingus) – 9:24
"Duke Ellington's Sound of Love" – 12:04

Personnel 

Recorded at Atlantic Recording Studios, New York City, on December 27, 28 & 30, 1974.

 Jack Walrath – trumpet
 George Adams – tenor saxophone, vocals
 Don Pullen – piano
 Charles Mingus – acoustic bass viol
 Dannie Richmond – drums
 İlhan Mimaroğlu – production
 Nesuhi Ertegün – production
 Gene Paul – engineer
 Paula Scher – designer

References

1975 albums
Charles Mingus albums
Atlantic Records albums
Albums produced by Nesuhi Ertegun
Attica Correctional Facility